Robert James Brown (23 July 192111 November 2003) was an English actor, best known for his portrayal of M in the James Bond films from 1983 to 1989, succeeding Bernard Lee, who died in 1981.

Brown made his first appearance as M in Octopussy in 1983.

Brown was born in Swanage, Dorset and later died there on November 11, 2003, aged 82. Before appearing in the Bond films, he had a long career as a bit-part actor in films and television. He had a starring role in the 1950s television series Ivanhoe where he played Gurth, the faithful companion of Ivanhoe, played by Roger Moore. He had previously made an uncredited appearance as a castle guard in the unrelated 1952 film Ivanhoe. He had an uncredited appearance as the galley-master in Ben-Hur (1959) and as factory worker Bert Harker in the BBC's 1960s soap opera The Newcomers. In One Million Years B.C. (1966), he played grunting caveman Akhoba, brutal head of the barbaric "Rock tribe".

Brown first started in the James Bond franchise in the film The Spy Who Loved Me as Admiral Hargreaves, appearing alongside Lee. After Lee's death in January 1981, Broccoli and the other producers, decided to leave M out of For Your Eyes Only out of respect for Lee and assigned his lines to M's Chief of Staff Bill Tanner. In 1983, Brown was hired to portray M on the recommendation of Bond actor Roger Moore, his Ivanhoe co-star and the father of Brown's goddaughter Deborah. It was never clearly established if Brown was the same M as Lee's character, or a different M, perhaps a promoted Hargreaves. In 1995, Brown was succeeded as M by Judi Dench in GoldenEye.

Filmography
Altogether, Robert Brown starred in five James Bond films.

The Spy Who Loved Me (1977) – Admiral Hargreaves (possibly the same character as M he played in subsequent films)
Octopussy (1983) – M
A View to a Kill (1985) – M
The Living Daylights (1987) – M
Licence to Kill (1989) – M

Other films:

 The Third Man (1949) – Policeman in sewer (coincidentally Bernard Lee is also in this film) (uncredited)
 Out of True (1951) – Dr. Dale
 The Dark Man (1951) – Policeman at Hospital (uncredited)
 Cloudburst (1951) – Carter
 Death of an Angel (1952) – Jim Pollard (uncredited)
 Derby Day (1952) – Foster – Berkeley's Butler (uncredited)
 Ivanhoe (1952) – Castle Guard (uncredited)
 Time Gentlemen, Please! (1952) – Bill Jordan
 The Gambler and the Lady (1952) – John – Waiter at Max's Dive (uncredited)
 Noose for a Lady (1953) – Jonas Rigg
 The Large Rope (1953) – Mick Jordan
 Passage Home (1955) – Shane
 The Dark Avenger (1955) – First French Knight
 Helen of Troy (1956) – Polydorus
 Lost (1956) – Farmer with Shotgun (uncredited)
 The Man Who Never Was (1956) – French (uncredited)
 A Hill in Korea (1956) – Private O'Brien
 Kill Me Tomorrow (1957) – Steve Ryan
 The Steel Bayonet (1957) – Company Sergeant Major Gill
 The Abominable Snowman (1957) – Ed Shelley
 Campbell's Kingdom (1957) – Ben Creasy
 Passport to Shame (1958) – Mike
 Shake Hands with the Devil (1959) – First Sergeant 'Black & Tans'
 Ben-Hur (1959) – Rowing Overseer (uncredited)
 Sink the Bismarck! (1960) – unnamed officer aboard  (uncredited)
 The Challenge (1960) – Bob Crowther
 Sands of the Desert (1960) – 1st Tourist
 A Story of David (1961) – Jashobeam
 The 300 Spartans (1962) – Pentheus
 Live Now, Pay Later (1962) – (unconfirmed)
 Billy Budd (1962) – Arnold Talbot
 The Double (1963) Edgar Wallace Mysteries – Richard Harrison
 Mystery Submarine (1963) – Coxswain Drage
 Dr. Syn, Alias the Scarecrow (1963) – Sam Farley
 The Masque of the Red Death (1964) – Guard
 Clash by Night (1963) – Mawsley
 Operation Crossbow (1965) – Air Commodore
 One Million Years B.C. (1966) – Akhoba
 Un hombre solo (1969)
 Tintin and the Temple of the Sun (1969) – Tarragon (English version, voice, uncredited)
 Private Road (1971) – Mr Halpern
 Fun and Games (1971) – Ralph
 Wreck Raisers (1972) – Cox'n
 Demons of the Mind (1972) – Fischinger
 Mohammad, Messenger of God (1976) – Otba
 Jesus of Nazareth (1977, TV Mini-Series) – Pharisee
 Warlords of Atlantis (1978) – Briggs
 The Passage (1979) – Major
 Lion of the Desert (1981) – Al Fadeel
 The Forgotten Story (1983, TV series) – Captain Stevens
 Jugando con la muerte (1982) – 2nd bodyguard

References

External links

1921 births
2003 deaths
English male film actors
English male television actors
People from Swanage
Deaths from cancer in England